The East Marmara Region (Turkish: Doğu Marmara Bölgesi) (TR4) is a statistical region in Turkey.

Subregions and provinces 

 Bursa Subregion (TR41)
 Bursa Province (TR411)
 Eskişehir Province (TR412)
 Bilecik Province (TR413)
 Kocaeli Subregion (TR42)
 Kocaeli Province (TR421)
 Sakarya Province (TR422)
 Düzce Province (TR423)
 Bolu Province (TR424)
 Yalova Province (TR425)

Age groups

Internal immigration

State register location of East Marmara residents

Marital status of 15+ population by gender

Education status of 15+ population by gender

See also 
 NUTS of Turkey

References

External links 
 TURKSTAT

Sources 
 ESPON Database

Statistical regions of Turkey